is a Japanese actor and singer.

Filmography

Drama

  (1996), Guest at Table 3
 ハートにS (1996)
  (1996)
 
 Shin-D Love Blood (1997)
  (1997)
 
 
  (1998)
  (1998)
  (1999)
  (1999)
  (1999)
  (2000)
 
 LOVE REVOLUTION (2001)
  (2001)
  (2001)
  (2002)
  (2002)
  (2003)
 
  (2004)
  (2005)
  (2005)
 
 1 Litre of Tears (2005)
  (2006)
 Gal Circle (2006)
 
 1 Litre of Tears SP (2007)
 Operation Love (2007)
 Hotaru no Hikari (2007)
 Operation Love SP (2008)
  (2008)
  2008
 (2009)
  (2010)
 PRICELE$S〜あるわけねぇだろ、んなもん!〜 (2012)
 Doctor-X Season 2 (2012), Kondo Shinobu
  (2015)
 Segodon (2018), Abe Masahiro
 Good Doctor (2018), Seiji Takayama
 Natsuzora (2019), Takeo Shibata
 Our Sister's Soulmate (2020), Satoshi Takada

TV series

TBC：
 MUSIC P.V.expo (2000)

TV Movies

Films

Animation
Coco, Héctor (Japanese dub)

Discography

Singles
 [1999.07.07] 世界の果て ～the end of the world～
 [1999.11.17] 虹 ～waiting for the rainbow～
 [2000.07.19] パーフェクトワールド (Perfect World)
 [2000.11.01] コズミックライダー (Cosmic Rider)
 [2001.04.18] 2 HEARTS
 [2001.08.01] anon
 [2001.11.21] パズル (Puzzle)
 [2002.02.20] Wonderful Days
 [2002.09.04] So Long... / 涙のいろ
 [2003.02.19] 天使ノ虹
 [2003.11.19] Flower
 [2004.12.01] シュクメイ (Shukumei)
 [2006.05.17] HEY! FRIENDS
 [2007.10.10] Tuning Note
 [2009.05.13] CRIME OF LOVE / いいんだぜ～君がいてくれれば～

Albums
 [2000.12.06] BUMP!
 [2002.03.20] WARP
 [2003.03.05] 03
 [2004.12.08] COLORMAN
 [2006.07.19] LIFE GOES ON!
 [2007.10.24] Reverse
 [2009.06.10] ∞ Octave
 [2009.07.15] HISTORY of NAOHITO FUJIKI 10TH ANNIVERSARY BOX

Mini Album
 [2004.07.28] 夏歌ウ者ハ冬泣ク

DVD
 [2001.01.10] nao-hit TV ver1.0
 [2001.11.21] 別冊 nao-hit TV ～2001 limited～
 [2002.09.04] NAO-HIT TV LIVE TOUR ver4.0 ～吉他小子的動作喜劇電影和演唱曾～
 [2002.12.18] NAO-HIT TV Live Tour ver.4.0 Complete Box
 [2003.11.19] NAO-HIT TV LIVE TOUR ver 5.0 ～今年こそっ!?大漁でSHOW!!～
 [2003.12.17] NAO-HIT TV MAKING OF LIVE TOUR ver5.0 今年こそっ!? 大漁でSHOW!!
 [2004.12.15] 夏歌冬泣 ～NAO-HIT TV LIVE TOUR ver 5.1～
 [2005.03.16] まっしろいカンバス ～NAO-HIT TV LIVE TOUR ver 6.0～」
 [2005.05.18] まっしろいカンバスSE～NAO-HIT TV LIVE TOUR ver 6.0 Special Edition～
 [2006.03.08] F△7-VISUAL COLLECTION-
 [2007.01.17] NAO-HIT TV Live Tour ver7.0～KNOCKIN' ON SEVENTH DOOR～FINAL IN 日本武道館
 [2008.03.05] NAO-HIT TV Live Tour ver8.0 ～LIVE US! TOUR～ 2007.12.6 日本武道館

VHS
 [2001.01.10] nao-hit TV ver1.0
 [2001.11.21] 別冊 nao-hit TV ～2001 limited～
 [2002.09.04] NAO-HIT TV LIVE TOUR ver4.0 ～吉他小子的動作喜劇電影和演唱曾～
 [2002.12.18] NAO-HIT TV Live Tour ver.4.0 Complete Box
 [2003.11.19] NAO-HIT TV LIVE TOUR ver 5.0 ～今年こそっ!?大漁でSHOW!!～
 [2003.12.17] NAO-HIT TV MAKING OF LIVE TOUR ver5.0 今年こそっ!? 大漁でSHOW!!

References

External links
 CUBE Group
 Official Pony Canyon Page
 JDorama Page
 

Japanese male film actors
Japanese male television actors
1972 births
Living people
Waseda University alumni
Japanese male pop singers
Japanese male rock singers
Actors from Okayama Prefecture
People from Kurashiki
Musicians from Okayama Prefecture
20th-century Japanese male actors
20th-century Japanese singers
20th-century Japanese male singers
21st-century Japanese male actors
21st-century Japanese singers
21st-century Japanese male singers
Pony Canyon artists